Uganda competed at the 2022 Commonwealth Games in Birmingham, England between 28 July and 8 August 2022. It was Uganda's sixteenth appearance at the Games.

Michael Wokorach and Peace Proscovia were the country's flagbearers during the opening ceremony.

Medalists

Competitors
The following is the list of number of competitors participating at the Games per sport/discipline.

Athletics

Men
Track and road events

Women
Track and road events

Badminton

By virtue of its position in the combined BWF World Ranking (as of 1 February 2022), Uganda qualified for the mixed team event. Eight players were selected as of 11 July 2022.

Singles

Doubles

Mixed team

Summary

Squad

Brian Kasirye
Israel Wanagaliya
Friday Attama
Kenneth Mwambu
Husna Kobugabe
Tracy Naluwooza
Fadilah Mohamed Rafi
Sharifah Wanyana

Group stage

Boxing

As of 29 June 2022, six boxers will take part in the competition.

Cycling

Road
Men

Women

Netball

By virtue of its position in the World Netball Rankings (as of 31 January 2022), Uganda qualified for the tournament.

Complete fixtures were announced in March 2022.

Summary

Roster
Twelve players were officially selected on 13 July 2022.

Peace Proscovia (c)
Mary Cholhok Nuba
Joan Nampungu (co-vc)
Jesca Achan (co-vc)
Shaffie Nalwanja
Stella Oyella
Norah Lunkuse
Margaret Baagala
Sandra Nambirige
Shadia Nassanga
Irene Eyaru
Hanisha Muhameed

Reserves: Viola Asingo, Faridah Kadondi, Alice Wasagali, Shakira Nakanyike, Desire Birungi

Group play

Fifth place match

Para powerlifting

Rugby sevens

As of 24 April 2022, Uganda qualified for the men's tournament. This was achieved through their position in the 2022 Africa Men's Sevens.

The thirteen-man roster was announced on 8 July 2022, with Levis Ocen named as a reserve.

Summary

Men's tournament

Roster
 
Ian Munyani
Adrian Kasito
William Nkore
Philip Wokorach
Timothy Kisiga
Michael Wokorach
Desire Ayera
Aaron Ofoyrowth
Isaac Massanganzira
Norbert Okeny
Ivan Otema
Karim Arinaitwe
Alex Aturinda

Pool D

Classification Quarterfinals

Classification Semifinals

Classification Finals

Squash

Swimming

Men

Women

Mixed

Table tennis

Uganda qualified for the women's team event. Four women were selected following the selection trials that concluded on 29 May 2022.

Singles

Doubles

Team

Weightlifting

Wrestling

References

External links
Commonwealth Games Association Uganda Official site

Nations at the 2022 Commonwealth Games
Uganda at the Commonwealth Games
2022 in Ugandan sport